Kelagim is a village in the Peren district of Nagaland, India. It is located in the Pedi (Ngwalwa) Circle.

Demographics 

According to the 2011 census of India, Kelagim has 15 households. The effective literacy rate (i.e. the literacy rate of population excluding children aged 6 and below) is 55.32%.

References 

Villages in Pedi (Ngwalwa) Circle